Acacia cedroides is a shrub belonging to the genus Acacia and the subgenus Phyllodineae that is endemic to Western Australia.

Description

It blooms from August to November and produces cream-yellow flowers. The simple inflorescences has spherical flower-heads that contain 15 to 25 cream to pale yellow coloured flowers.

Distribution
It is native to an area along the south coast in the Great Southern and the Goldfields-Esperance regions of Western Australia between Jerramungup and Ravensthorpe where it is found on rocky hillsides growing in shallow stony soils with most of the population found in the Fitzgerald River National Park.

See also
 List of Acacia species

References

cedroides
Acacias of Western Australia
Taxa named by George Bentham
Plants described in 1855